Plombières (or Bleiberg,) is a municipality of Wallonia located in the province of Liège, Belgium. 

On 1 January 2006, Plombières had a total population of 10,401. The total area is 53.17 km2 which gives a population density of 200 inhabitants per km2.

The municipality consists of the following districts: Gemmenich, Hombourg, Montzen, Moresnet, and Sippenaeken.

The local language is Low Dietsch, a bridge dialect between East Limburgish and Ripuarian.

Gallery

See also
 List of protected heritage sites in Plombières
 Viaduct of Moresnet

References

External links
 

 
Municipalities of Liège Province